Sarysu is a district of Jambyl Region in south-eastern Kazakhstan. The administrative center of the district is the town of Janatas. It

Geography
The district is named after the Sarysu River. Parts of it are in the lower basin of the Chu river, at the edge of the Moiynkum Desert. Lakes Ulken Kamkaly and Sorkol are located in the district.

References

External links

Districts of Kazakhstan
Jambyl Region